The 2017–18 Liga Bet season was the 62nd season of fourth tier football in Israel.

Changes from last season

Team changes

Promotion and relegation

 To replace the folded Hapoel F.C. Karmiel Safed, Tzeirei Tamra was promoted from Liga Gimel, as the best second-placed team in the northern divisions.
 In December 2016, the IFA was ordered to demote Maccabi Umm al-Fahm to Liga Gimel by FIFA due to an unpaid debt. The club, which finished 11th in North B division was demoted at the end of the season and was replaced initially by Maccabi Ironi Tamra, the second best second-placed team in the northern divisions of Liga Gimel. However, an appeal was lodged by Beitar Pardes Hanna, which was the best second-placed team in the Liga Gimel division which promote to North B division, claiming that only teams from the Jezre'el and Samaria division should be considered for promotion as replacement to Maccabi Umm al-Fahm. The IFA Supreme Court accepted the appeal and Promoted Beitar Pardes Hanna to Liga Bet.
During the summer the merger between Maccabi Ironi Acre and Hapoel Kiryat Yam broke up, leading Hapoel Kiryat Yam to register the club in Liga Gimel. Maccabi Ironi Acre then merged with Maccabi Sektzia Ma'alot-Tarshiha, effectively reprieving Sektzia Ma'alot from relegation.

Format changes
 The IFA introduced promotion/relegations playoffs between Liga Bet and Liga Gimel. As a result, The two bottom club of each Liga Bet division will relegate directly to Liga Gimel, while the 13th placed and 14th placed teams in each division will face each other in one match. The losing team will face the Liga Gimel play-off winner in a single match for a spot in Liga Bet.

North A Division

Results

Positions by round

North B Division

Results

Positions by round

South A Division

Results

Positions by round

South B Division

Results

Positions by round

Promotion play-offs

Northern Divisions

1The match was abandoned at the 116th minute with Hapoel Bnei Fureidis leading 3–1 as Bnei Kafr Qara staff attacked the fourth official.Fureidis Celebrated in Kafr Qara, The Match Was Abandoned During Extra Time Roni Navon, 13 April 2018, Yalla  The match was given as a walkover to Hapoel Bnei Fureidis, while Kafr Qara had two points deducted for the next season campaign.

Southern Divisions

Promotion play-off matches

North section

South Section

Relegation play-offs

North A

Sektzia Ma'alot remained in Liga Bet; Maccabi Ironi Yafa remained in Liga Gimel

South A

Hapoel Kiryat Ono remained in Liga Bet; Bnei Yehud remained in Liga Gimel

North B

Maccabi Ein Mahil remained in Liga Bet; Ihud Bnei Baqa remained in Liga Gimel

South B

Tzeirei Rahat relegated to Liga Gimel; Ironi Kusiefe promoted to Liga Bet

References

External links
 The Israel Football Association 
 The Israel Football Association 
 The Israel Football Association 
 The Israel Football Association 

Liga Bet seasons
4
Israel
https://mawdea.com